The Nativity Story is a 2006 American biblical drama film based on the nativity of Jesus and directed by Catherine Hardwicke. The film stars Keisha Castle-Hughes, Oscar Isaac, Hiam Abbass, Shaun Toub, Alexander Siddig, Ciarán Hinds, and Shohreh Aghdashloo.

The Nativity Story premiered in Vatican City on November 26, 2006, making it the first film to hold a world premiere in the city, and was released in the United States on December 1, 2006, by New Line Cinema. The film received mixed reviews from critics and grossed over $46 million worldwide.

Plot
The story begins in the Roman province of Judea with the portrayal of the Massacre of the Innocents in the Nativity. The remainder of the film portrays the annunciation and birth of Jesus Christ to explain why King Herod the Great (Ciarán Hinds) ordered the murder.

One year before the massacre, Zechariah (Stanley Townsend), a rabbi in Jerusalem, is making an offering, when he is told in a vision by the Archangel Gabriel (Alexander Siddig) that his wife, Elizabeth (Shohreh Aghdashloo), will bear a son. Zechariah does not believe him, stating that he is too old, and Gabriel tells him that he will be unable to speak until the boy is born. In Nazareth, 16 to 17-year-old Mary (Keisha Castle-Hughes) lives a peaceful life with her family, only for that to be ruined as soldiers constantly come to collect taxes; one man, unable to pay, has a third of his land seized and his daughter pressed into debt slavery. Mary, betrothed to 32-year-old Joseph of Judaea (Oscar Isaac), is soon visited by Archangel Gabriel and told that she will become pregnant with God's son, whom she will name "Jesus". He tells her that God has blessed her cousin Elizabeth with a child despite her old age. Mary visits her before the harvest, where she witnesses the birth of John the Baptist to Elizabeth and Zechariah, who regains his speech. Mary returns from the visit pregnant, to the shock of Joseph and her parents, who fear that Joseph will accuse her of adultery, a sin punishable by death through stoning according to the Torah. Joseph does not believe Mary's religious explanation, but decides not to accuse her. Still shocked and angry, he is later visited in a dream by the Archangel Gabriel, who tells him of God's plan for Mary's son and to take Mary as his wife. 

Meanwhile, Emperor Augustus has demanded that every man across the Empire return with his family to his place of birth for the census. With Mary on a donkey laden with supplies, it takes the couple nearly four weeks to reach Bethlehem. Upon arriving in town, Mary goes into labour, and Joseph frantically seeks a place for her to deliver. There is, however, no room in any inn or home because of the people arriving for the census, but at the last minute, an innkeeper offers his stable for shelter.

Meanwhile, three Magi—Caspar, Melchior and Balthasar (Stefan Kalipha, Nadim Sawalha and Eriq Ebouaney) —travel towards Judaea after having previously discovered that three planets will align to form a great star. This Star of Bethlehem appears before the Magi, after a visit by the Archangel Gabriel. The Magi visit Herod and reveal to him that the Messiah is still a child and he will be a Messiah "for the lowest of men to the highest of kings." Shocked by this, Herod asks that they visit the newborn Messiah and report the child's location back to him, under the pretence that he, too, would like to worship him, while in fact he plans to kill the baby for fear of a new king usurping him. The Magi arrive at the stable where Mary has given birth to Jesus, and they present the infant with gifts of gold, frankincense, and myrrh.

Suspicious of his intentions, the Magi avoid Herod, returning home via a different route. Herod realises that the Magi have tricked him and orders the death of every boy in Bethlehem under the age of two. Joseph is warned in a dream of the danger and flees to Egypt with Mary and Jesus as the film ends.

Cast
 Oscar Isaac as Joseph
 Keisha Castle-Hughes as Mary
 Hiam Abbass as Anna
 Shaun Toub as Joachim
 Ciarán Hinds as Herod the Great
 Shohreh Aghdashloo as Elizabeth
 Stanley Townsend as Zechariah
 Alexander Siddig as the Angel Gabriel
 Eriq Ebouaney as Balthasar
 Alessandro Giuggioli as Herod Antipas
 Nadim Sawalha as Melchior
 Stefan Kalipha as Saint Caspar

Production
The film was shot in Matera and Craco, Italy, and Ouarzazate, Morocco.

Reception

Box office
The Nativity Story opened to a modest first weekend at the domestic box office by grossing $7.8 million, with a 39% increase over the extended Christmas weekend. After its initial run, the film closed out with about $37.6 million in domestic gross and $8.8 million in foreign gross, resulting in a worldwide total of almost $46.4 million on a reported $35 million budget.

Critical response
The Nativity Story received mixed reviews. , the film holds a 37% approval rating on the review aggregator Rotten Tomatoes, based on 131 reviews with an average rating of 5.29/10. The site's consensus says, "The Nativity Story is a dull retelling of a well-worn tale with the look and feel of a high-school production." Metacritic, which assigns a weighted average score out of 100 to reviews from mainstream critics, gives the film a score of 52 based on 28 reviews.

A. O. Scott of The New York Times gave the film a positive review saying, "At its best, The Nativity Story shares with Hail Mary an interest in finding a kernel of realism in the old story of a pregnant teenager in hard times. Buried in the pageantry, in other words, is an interesting movie." Ann Hornaday of The Washington Post concluded a positive review of the film stating, "The most intriguing thing about The Nativity Story transpires during the couple's extraordinary personal journey, advancing a radical idea in an otherwise long slog of a cinematic Sunday school lesson: that Jesus became Who He was not only because He was the Son of God, but because He was the son of a good man."

Conversely, many critics felt that the film did not take the story to new cinematic heights. Owen Gleiberman of Entertainment Weekly noted, "The Nativity Story is a film of tame picture-book sincerity, but that's not the same thing as devotion. The movie is too tepid to feel, or see, the light." Kenneth Turan of the Los Angeles Times said, "This is not a chance to 'experience the most timeless of stories as you've never seen it before' but just the opposite: an opportunity, for those who want it, to encounter this story exactly the way it's almost always been told."

Incidents
Keisha Castle-Hughes became pregnant during filming, at the age of 16, and received a lot of media attention.

Music
Mychael Danna's score of the film was released as an album on December 5, 2006. The album was nominated for a Dove Award for Instrumental Album of the Year at the 39th GMA Dove Awards.

An album of songs inspired by the film was also released under the title The Nativity Story: Sacred Songs. It featured music by artists like Point of Grace, Amy Grant, Jaci Velasquez, and others.

See also
 List of Christmas films

References

External links
 
 
 

2006 films
2000s Christmas drama films
2000s Christmas films
American Christmas films
Depictions of Herod the Great on film
Films about the Nativity of Jesus
Films directed by Catherine Hardwicke
Films scored by Mychael Danna
Films shot in Matera
2006 romantic drama films
American romantic drama films
Portrayals of Jesus in film
Portrayals of the Virgin Mary in film
Religious epic films
New Line Cinema films
Temple Hill Entertainment films
Cultural depictions of John the Baptist
American pregnancy films
Films about Christianity
Films produced by Wyck Godfrey
2000s American films